This is a list of mayors of the city of Maastricht, capital of the province of Limburg, Netherlands.

See also
 Timeline of Maastricht

Bibliography
 Mayors of Maastricht since 1800

Maastricht